= Kazim Bulut Mosque =

Mosque in Alanya, Antalya, Turkey

- Kazım Bulut Camii
- Location within Turkey

Religion
- Affiliation: Islam

Location
- Municipality: Alanya
- State: Antalya
- Country: Turkey
- Interactive map of Kazim Bulut Mosque
- Coordinates: 36.550°N 31.992°E

Architecture
- Type: mosque

Specifications
- Capacity: 840 worshippers
- Length: 67 m (220 ft)
- Width: 64 m (210 ft)
- Dome: 1
- Dome height (outer): 48.5 m (159 ft)
- Dome dia. (outer): 25.5 m (84 ft)
- Minaret: 1
- Minaret height: 88 m (289 ft)

The Kazim Bulut Mosque (Turkish: Kazım Bulut Camii) is a mosque in Turkey situated in the city of Alanya in the province of Antalya Province.
